Carnavas is the debut studio album by alternative band Silversun Pickups. It was released on July 25, 2006. "Carnavas" is a surname from the Greek side of lead guitarist and vocalist Brian Aubert's family. Some suppliers were also given copies of The Tripwire Session: Live in Chicago, a four-track EP.

The album generated two successful singles on the US Modern Rock chart. "Lazy Eye" hit number 5 in 2007 and "Well Thought Out Twinkles" reached number 9 in 2008. Carnavas has sold more than 500,000 copies and was certified gold in the US on May 31, 2018.

Artwork 
The CD cover for Carnavas is a slightly edited partial image of artist Darren Waterston's 2004 painting entitled Summit.  The inlay, also featured on the Silversun Pickups' website and Myspace page, is titled "Becoming Tree".

In popular culture
The song "Rusted Wheel" was used during the end credits roll of the film Puncture. The song "Well Thought Out Twinkles" is featured on the soundtrack of the skateboarding video game Tony Hawk's Proving Ground on top of being downloadable content for the games Rock Band and Rock Band 2 along with "Melatonin".

Similarly, "Lazy Eye" is a playable song in both Rock Band 2 and Guitar Hero World Tour. The song is also featured on the Forza Horizon soundtrack, on the "Horizon Rocks" station  and also featured in television advertising for New World supermarkets in New Zealand. The band has performed "Lazy Eye" on the Late Show with David Letterman, The Tonight Show with Jay Leno, Later With Jools Holland, and Last Call with Carson Daly.

The music video for "Lazy Eye" received airplay on MTV, MTV2, MTVU, VH1, Fuse, MuchMusic, MTV (Latin America), International Music Feed and many other international broadcast outlets. The popularity of the "Lazy Eye" music video led to the creation of a VH1 "Pop-Up Video" version and it was among the MTV2 Subterranean "Viewers Top 20 Music Videos of 2007" list.

Track listing

Vinyl edition 

The 2 bonus tracks come on a 7" in some vinyl editions of the album, along with a card to download both the tracks online.

Personnel 
 Brian Aubert – guitar/vocals
 Nikki Monninger – bass/backing vocals
 Christopher Guanlao – drums
 Joe Lester – keyboards
 Dave Cooley – producer
 Tom Biller – engineer
 Tony Hoffer – mixing

Charts

Album

Singles

Tour 

The Carnavas Tour, the first ever major Silversun Pickups tour, kicked off on July 6, 2006.

Only around 50 shows have known setlists out of the 226 shows as of October 1, 2022.

Set list 

 "Well Thought Out Twinkles"
 "Dream at Tempo 119"
 "Rusted Wheel"
 "Little Lover's So Polite"
 "Future Foe Scenarios"
 "Kissing Families"
 "Lazy Eye"
 "Common Reactor"

Other songs 

 list does not include cover songs 
 "The Royal We" (played on 28 September 2008)
 "Panic Switch" (played on 24 March 2007, 7, 28 September 2008)
 "There's No Secrets This Year" (played on 24 March 2007)
 "Booksmart Devil" (played on 15 September 2007)
 "Checkered Floor" (played on 24 March 2007, 19, 20 October 2007)
 "...All the Go Inbetweens" (played on 13 August 2006, 12 April 2007, 8, 10 May 2007, 29 June 2007, 27 July 2007, 15 September 2007, 19, 20 October 2007, 17 November 2007)
 "Melatonin" (occasionally played from July 2006 to November 2007)
 "Comeback Kid" (played on 13 August 2006, 14 November 2006, occasionally played from April to November 2007, played on 29 March 2008)
 "Waste It On" (played on 29 July 2006, 14 November 2006, occasionally played from April to November 2007)
 "Three Seed" (occasionally played from April to November 2007)

References 

2006 albums
Silversun Pickups albums